Charles Nightingale Beazley (1834–97), was a British architect. His work spans the period 1853–97.

Career
Beazley was articled to William Wardell in 1853 and was an RIBA student 1854–56. In 1856–58 he was an assistant to G.E. Street, who was the diocesan architect for the Church of England Diocese of Oxford. Beazley began independent practice in 1860, and from 1884 worked in partnership with H.W. Burrows. Like Street, Beazley worked on a number of commissions to restore Church of England parish churches and design new ones. In the 1870s and 1880s Beazley worked extensively in Westgate-on-Sea, Kent. He was made a Fellow of the RIBA in 1880 but resigned in 1897, the year of his death.

Work
St. Eadburg's parish church, Bicester, Oxfordshire: restoration, 1862–63
St. Mark's parish church, Cold Ash, Berkshire, 1864–66
St. Michael & All Angels parish church, Newton Purcell, Oxfordshire: restoration, 1875
St. Mildred's parish church, Acol, Kent, 1879
Ellingham, St Clement's Road, Westgate-on-Sea, Kent, 1883
St. Saviour's parish church, Westgate-on-Sea, Kent, 1884

References

Sources

19th-century English architects
English ecclesiastical architects
1834 births
1897 deaths
Fellows of the Royal Institute of British Architects
Architects from Surrey
People from Westgate-on-Sea